The 1962 United States Senate election in Indiana took place on November 6, 1962. Incumbent Republican U.S. Senator Homer Capehart ran for re-election to a fourth consecutive term in office, but was narrowly defeated by Democratic State Representative Birch Bayh.

General election

Candidates
Birch Bayh, State Representative from Terre Haute
Homer Capehart, incumbent Senator since 1945

Results

See also 
 1962 United States Senate elections

References

1962
Indiana
United States Senate